The N6 is a national route in South Africa that connects East London with Bloemfontein, via Komani and Maletswai. It runs roughly from north to south, connecting the N1 with the N2.

Route

Eastern Cape
The N6 begins in the City of East London in the Buffalo City Metropolitan Municipality of the Eastern Cape Province, next to the Nahoon River, at an interchange with the N2 Highway. South of the highway, it is the R72 Road towards East London CBD.

It begins by going northwest from the N2 interchange for 31 kilometres to the town of Macleantown, where it leaves the Buffalo City Metropolitan Municipality. It continues northwest for another 21 kilometres to meet the R63 Road at an intersection just north-east of Kei Road.

It continues northwest for 19 kilometers to the town of Stutterheim. It proceeds northwest for another 47 kilometers to the town of Cathcart. It proceeds north-north-west for 54 kilometres, crossing the Black Kei River, to reach Queenstown (town renamed Komani in February 2016).

14 kilometers before Komani, the R61 meets the N6 and they are one road into the town of Komani. In the Stuttaford suburb of Komani, the R61 becomes its own road westwards at the roundabout junction with Barrable Street.

The N6 continues northwards for 162 kilometres as the Penhoek Pass, bypassing Sterkstroom, meeting the R56 and passing through Jamestown, to the town of Aliwal North (renamed Maletswai in 2016), where it meets the R58. At the junction with Barkly Street in Maletswai, the N6 makes a left turn and proceeds to cross the Orange River into the Free State as the General Hertzog Bridge.

Free State
From the Orange River crossing at Maletswai, the N6 goes north-north-east for 34 kilometres to the town of Rouxville, where it meets the southern terminus of the R26. It turns to the north-west and continues for 37 kilometres, crossing the Caledon River, to the town of Smithfield, where the R701 joins it in the southern suburbs before they split in the northern suburbs.

From Smithfield, the N6 continues north-north-west for 70 kilometres to the town of Reddersburg, where it is joined by the R717 from Edenburg in the southern suburbs before they split in the central area. From Reddersburg, the N6 makes a direct line for Bloemfontein, going northwards for 49 kilometres to reach a four-way junction south-west of the Bloemfontein suburb of Mangaung (which is also the name of the Metropolitan Municipality in which the city is located). As the road northwards from this junction is the M30 Metropolitan Route towards the Mangaung suburb and Bloemfontein Central, the N6 becomes the road westwards and proceeds to end at the next junction, which is an interchange with the N1 Highway (Bloemfontein Western Bypass).

History
Prior to 1970, the N6 began from King William's Town in the Buffalo City Metropolitan Municipality and proceeded through Stutterheim. Today, the road from King William's Town to Stutterheim is designated as the R346 Road. Also, the N6 used to end at its current junction with the R717 south of the Reddersburg Town Centre, as the R717 from Edenburg to Reddersburg, together with the N6 from Reddersburg to Bloemfontein, formed part of the N1 National Route.

References

External links

 National Roads Agency SA

National Roads in South Africa
Roads in South Africa